The Roko Tui Dreketi is the Paramount Chief of Fiji's Rewa Province and of the Burebasaga Confederacy, to which Rewa belongs.

Details on the title
This title is considered the second most senior in Fiji's House of Chiefs. The dynasty holding the title is the Tuisawau family. Unlike many other chiefly titles, this one is not reserved for males, as it had become a common occurrence among many other parts of Fiji.

Recent history
The present Roko Tui Dreketi is Ro Teimumu Vuikaba Tuisawau-Kepa, who was the Minister for Education in the Qarase government. She succeeded her late sister Ro Lady Lala Mara, Fiji's former First Lady, in 2004.

Title holders
 Note that the table below contains incomplete information.  The period from 1839 through 1845 was a time of conflicting claims to the title.

References 
Elites: Choice, Leadership and succession, Chapter 6 Making the Chief – Page 116, By Antonia Pedroso de Lima, Joao de Pina-Cabral, Published first in 2000 by Berg Editorial Offices, Oxford, U.K
1. Ro Rawalai 
2. Ro banuve Bativuaka Lutunauga

External links 
 Roko Tui Dreketi

 
Roko Tui Dreketi